The Iron Springs Formation is a geologic formation in Utah. It preserves fossils dating back to the Cretaceous period.

See also

 List of fossiliferous stratigraphic units in Utah
 Paleontology in Utah

References

 

Cretaceous geology of Utah